The Northern Mariana Islands, officially the Commonwealth of the Northern Mariana Islands (CNMI;), is an unincorporated territory and commonwealth of the United States consisting of 14 islands in the northwestern Pacific Ocean. The CNMI includes the 14 northernmost islands in the Mariana Archipelago; the southernmost island, Guam, is a separate U.S. territory. The Northern Marianas Islands are listed by the United Nations as one of 17 non-self governing territories.

According to the 2020 United States Census, 47,329 people were living in the CNMI at that time. The vast majority of the population resides on Saipan, Tinian, and Rota. The other islands of the Northern Marianas are sparsely inhabited; the most notable among these is Pagan, which for various reasons over the centuries has experienced major population flux, but formerly had residents numbering in the thousands.

The administrative center is Capitol Hill, a village in northwestern Saipan.

History

Arrival of humans

The Mariana Islands were the first islands settled by humans in Remote Oceania. Incidentally it is also the first and the longest of the ocean-crossing voyages of the Austronesian peoples, and is separate from the later Polynesian settlement of the rest of Remote Oceania. They were first settled around 1500 to 1400 BC by migrants departing from the Philippines. This was followed by a second migration from the Caroline Islands by the first millennium AD, and a third migration from Island Southeast Asia (likely the Philippines or eastern Indonesia) by 900 AD.

After first contact with Spaniards, they eventually became known as the Chamorros, a Spanish word similar to Chamori, the name of the indigenous caste system's higher division.

The ancient people of the Marianas raised colonnades of megalithic capped pillars called latte stones upon which they built their homes. The Spanish reported that by the time of their arrival, the largest of these were already in ruins, and that the Chamorros believed the ancestors who had erected the pillars lived in an era when people possessed supernatural abilities.

In 2013 archaeologists posited that the first people to settle in the Marianas may have made what was at that point the longest uninterrupted ocean-crossing voyage in human history. Archeological evidence indicates that Tinian may have been the first Pacific island to be settled.

Spanish possession

The Portuguese navigator Ferdinand Magellan, sailing under the Spanish flag, arrived in 1521. He and his crew were the first Europeans to arrive in the Mariana Islands. He landed on Guam, the southernmost island of the Marianas, and claimed the archipelago for Spain. The Spanish ships were met offshore by the native Chamorros, who delivered refreshments and then helped themselves to a small boat belonging to Magellan's fleet. This led to a cultural clash: in Chamorro tradition, little property was private and taking something one needed, such as a boat for fishing, did not count as stealing. The Spanish did not understand this custom and fought the Chamorros until the boat was recovered. Three days after he had been welcomed on his arrival, Magellan fled the archipelago. Spain regarded the islands as annexed and later made them part of the Spanish East Indies in 1565. In 1734, the Spanish built a royal palace, the Plaza de España, in Guam for the governor of the islands. The palace was largely destroyed during World War II, but portions of it remain.

Guam operated as an important stopover between the Philippines and Mexico for Manila galleon carrying trading between Spanish colonies.

In 1668, Father Diego Luis de San Vitores renamed the islands Las Marianas in honor of his patroness the Spanish regent Mariana of Austria (1634–1696), widow of Felipe IV (reigned 1621–1665).

Most of the islands' native population (90–95%) died from European diseases carried by the Spaniards or married non-Chamorro settlers under Spanish rule. New settlers, primarily from the Philippines and the Caroline Islands, were brought to repopulate the islands. The Chamorro population gradually recovered, and Chamorro, Filipino, and Refaluwasch languages and other ethnic groups remain in the Marianas.

During the 17th century, Spanish colonists forcibly moved the Chamorros to Guam, to encourage assimilation and conversion to Roman Catholicism. By the time they were allowed to return to the Northern Marianas, many Carolinians from present-day eastern Yap State and western Chuuk State had settled in the Marianas. Both languages, as well as English, are now official in the commonwealth.

Carolinian immigration
The Northern Marianas experienced an influx of immigration from the Carolines during the 19th century. Both this Carolinian subethnicity and Carolinians in the Carolines archipelago refer to themselves as the Refaluwasch. The indigenous Chamoru word for the same group of people is gu'palao. They are usually referred to simply as "Carolinians", though unlike the other two monikers, this can also mean those who actually live in the Carolines and who may have no affiliation with the Marianas.

The conquering Spanish did not focus attempts at cultural suppression against Carolinian immigrants, whose immigration they allowed during a period when the indigenous Chamoru majority was being subjugated with land alienation, forced relocations and internment. Carolinians in the Marianas continue to be fluent in the Carolinian language, and have maintained many of the cultural distinctions and traditions of their ethnicity's land of ancestral origin.

German possession and Japanese mandate

Following its loss during the Spanish–American War of 1898, Spain ceded Guam to the United States and sold the remainder of the Marianas (i.e., the Northern Marianas), along with the Caroline Islands, to Germany under the German–Spanish Treaty of 1899. The United States could have taken the entire Marianas but beyond Guam saw no need for the group. Germany administered the islands as part of its colony of German New Guinea and did little in terms of development.

Early in World War I, Japan declared war on Germany and invaded the Northern Marianas. In 1919, the League of Nations (LoN) awarded all of Germany's islands in the Pacific Ocean located north of the Equator, including the Northern Marianas, under mandate to Japan. Under this arrangement, the Japanese thus administered the Northern Marianas as part of the South Seas Mandate. During the Japanese period, sugar cane became the main industry of the islands. Garapan on Saipan was developed as a regional capital, and numerous Japanese (including ethnic Koreans, Okinawan, and Taiwanese) migrated to the islands. In the December 1939 census, the total population of the South Seas Mandate was 129,104, of whom 77,257 were Japanese (including ethnic Taiwanese and Koreans). On Saipan the pre-war population comprised 29,348 Japanese settlers and 3,926 Chamorro and Caroline Islanders; Tinian had 15,700 Japanese settlers (including 2,700 ethnic Koreans and 22 ethnic Chamorro).

World War II

On December 8, 1941, hours after the attack on Pearl Harbor, Japanese forces from the Marianas launched an invasion of Guam. Chamorros from the Northern Marianas, which had been under Japanese rule for more than 20 years, were brought to Guam to assist the Japanese administration. This, combined with the harsh treatment of Guamanian Chamorros during the 31-month occupation, created a rift that would become the main reason Guamanians rejected the referendum on reunification of Guam with the northern marianas approved by the Northern Marianas in the 1960s.

On June 15, 1944, the United States military invaded the Mariana Islands, starting the Battle of Saipan, which ended on July 9. Of the 30,000 Japanese troops defending Saipan, fewer than 1,000 remained alive at the battle's end. Many civilians were also killed, by disease, starvation, enemy fire, or suicide – about 1,000 civilians killed themselves by jumping off cliffs. U.S. forces then recaptured Guam on July 21, and invaded Tinian on July 24. A year later Tinian was the takeoff point for the Enola Gay, the plane that dropped the atomic bomb on Hiroshima. Rota was left untouched (and isolated) until the Japanese surrender in August 1945, owing to its military insignificance. The story of the holdouts on Anatahan was told in 1953 by Josef von Sternberg in his film The Saga of Anatahan.

The war did not end for everyone with the signing of the armistice. The last group of Japanese holdouts surrendered on Saipan on December 1, 1945. On Guam, Japanese soldier Shoichi Yokoi, unaware that the war had ended, hid in a jungle cave in the Talofofo area until 1972.

Japanese nationals were eventually repatriated to the Japanese home islands.

United Nations trusteeship

After Japan's defeat in World War II, the Northern Marianas were administered by the United States pursuant to Security Council Resolution 21 as part of the United Nations Trust Territory of the Pacific Islands, which assigned responsibility for defense and foreign affairs to the United States as trustee. Four referendums offering integration with Guam or changes to the islands' status were held in 1958, 1961, 1963 and 1969. On each occasion, a majority voted in favor of integration with Guam, but this did not happen: Guam rejected integration in a 1969 referendum.

Commonwealth

The people of the Northern Mariana Islands decided in the 1970s not to seek independence, but instead to forge closer links with the United States. Negotiations for commonwealth status began in 1972 and a covenant to establish a commonwealth in political union with the United States was approved in a 1975 referendum. A new government and constitution partially came into effect in on January 9, 1978 after being approved in a 1977 referendum. The United Nations approved this arrangement pursuant to Security Council Resolution 683. The Northern Mariana Islands came under U.S. sovereignty on November 4, 1986, and the islanders became US citizens. Also on November 4, 1986, the Northern Mariana Islands constitution became fully effective under the Covenant.

In May 1981, volcanic eruptions led to evacuation of the island of Pagan. Most residents of Pagan have not yet returned to Pagan.

The Chamorro-Carolinian Language Policy Commission was created in 1982 to carry out policies in support of the Chamorro and Carolinian languages and cultures.

In December 1986, twenty percent of the homes on Saipan were destroyed by Typhoon Kim, trees were stripped of foliage, thousands of coconut trees were knocked down, roads were blocked, and there was no electricity or public water supply for weeks.

In April 1990, the inhabitants of the western coast of Anatahan were evacuated after earthquake swarms and active fumaroles indicated that an eruption might be imminent, but no eruption occurred at that time. A further earthquake swarm occurred in May 1992.

The Northern Mariana Islands does not have voting representation in the United States Congress, but, since 2009, has been represented in the U.S. House of Representatives by a delegate; congressional delegates may participate in debates and serve on congressional committees but may not cast decisive votes on the House floor.

Geography

The Northern Mariana Islands, together with Guam to the south, compose the Mariana Islands archipelago. The southern islands are limestone, with level terraces and fringing coral reefs. The northern islands are volcanic, with active volcanoes on several islands, including Anatahan, Pagan, and Agrihan. An expedition organized by John D. Mitchler and Reid Larson made the first complete ascent to the summit of this peak on June 1, 2018.

Anatahan began erupting from its east crater on May 10, 2003. It has since alternated between eruptive and calm periods. On April 6, 2005, an estimated  of ash and rock were ejected, causing a large, black cloud to drift south over Saipan and Tinian.

Northernmost point – Farallon de Pajaros
Easternmost point – Farallon de Medinilla
Southernmost point – Puntan Malikok, Rota
Westernmost point – Farallon de Pajaros

The islands lie in the Marianas tropical dry forests terrestrial ecoregion.

Climate
The Northern Mariana Islands have a tropical rainforest climate (Köppen: Af) moderated by seasonal northeast trade winds, with little seasonal temperature variation. The dry season runs from December to June; the rainy season runs from July to November and can include typhoons. The Guinness Book of World Records has said Saipan has the most equable climate in the world.

Politics and government

The Northern Mariana Islands have a multiparty presidential representative democratic system. They are a commonwealth of the United States. Federal funds to the commonwealth are administered by the Office of Insular Affairs of the U.S. Department of the Interior.

Replicating the separation of powers elsewhere in the United States, the executive branch is headed by the governor of the Northern Mariana Islands; legislative power is vested in the bicameral Northern Mariana Islands Commonwealth Legislature and the judicial power is vested in the CNMI Supreme Court and the trial courts inferior to it.

Some critics, including the author of the political website Saipan Sucks, say that politics in the Northern Mariana Islands is often "more a function of family relationships and personal loyalties" where the size of one's extended family is more important than a candidate's personal qualifications. They charge that this is nepotism carried out within the trappings of democracy.

In April 2012, anticipating a loss of funding by 2014, the commonwealth's public pension fund declared Chapter 11 bankruptcy. The retirement fund is a defined benefit-type pension plan and was only partially funded by the government, with only $268.4 million in assets and $911 million in liabilities. The plan experienced low investment returns and a benefit structure that had been increased without raises in funding.

In August 2012, cries for impeachment arose, as the sitting governor Benigno Fitial was being held responsible for withholding payments from the pension fund, not paying the local utility (Commonwealth Utilities or "CUC") for government offices, cutting off funding to the only hospital in the Northern Marianas, interfering with the delivery of a subpoena to his attorney general, withholding required funds from the public schools, and for signing a sole source $190 million contract for power generation.

Northern Mariana Islands’ delegation to the 2016 Republican National Convention boasted about being "the most Republican territory" in the U.S. As of 2017, the Republican Party had large majorities in both the Northern Mariana Islands Senate and the Northern Mariana Islands House of Representatives.

Administrative divisions
The islands total . The table gives an overview, with the individual islands listed from north to south:

Administratively, the CNMI is divided into four municipalities:

The Northern Islands (north of Saipan) form the Northern Islands Municipality. The three main islands of the Southern Islands form the municipalities of Saipan, Tinian, and Rota, with uninhabited Aguijan forming part of Tinian municipality.

Because of volcanic threat, the northern islands have been evacuated. Human habitation was limited to Agrihan, Pagan, and Alamagan, but population varied due to various economic factors, including children's education. The 2020 census showed only seven residents in the Northern Islands Municipality, and the Northern Islands' mayor office is located in "exile" on Saipan.

Saipan, Tinian, and Rota have the only ports and harbors and are the only permanently populated islands.

For statistical purposes, the United States Census Bureau counts the four municipalities of the Northern Mariana Islands as county equivalents.

Political status and autonomy
In 1947, the Northern Mariana Islands became part of the post–World War II United Nations Trust Territory of the Pacific Islands (TTPI). The United States became the TTPI's administering authority under the terms of a trusteeship agreement. In 1976, Congress approved the mutually negotiated Covenant to establish a Commonwealth of the Northern Mariana Islands in Political Union with the United States of America. The Covenant was codified on March 24, 1976, as Public Law 94-241. The Commonwealth of the Northern Mariana Islands (CNMI) government adopted its own constitution in 1977, and the new government took office in January 1978. Implementation of Covenant, which took effect on January 1, 1978, was completed on November 3, 1986, pursuant to Presidential Proclamation no. 5564; which placed into effect the Covenant With the Commonwealth of the Northern Mariana Islands, and the Compacts of Free Association With the Federated States of Micronesia and the Republic of the Marshall Islands. This allowed the CNMI to be represented to the United States Government in Washington, DC by a Resident Representative, elected at-large by CNMI voters and whose office was paid for by the CNMI government. The Consolidated Natural Resources Act of 2008 ("CNRA"), approved by the U.S. Congress on May 8, 2008, established a CNMI delegate's seat; Democrat Gregorio Sablan was elected in November 2008 as the first CNMI delegate and took office in the 111th Congress. Like the other five delegates in the House, the CNMI delegate participates in debates and vote in committee but has no vote on the floor of the House of Representatives, and has no role in the U.S. Senate, but is equal to a Senator when serving on a conference committee.

On December 22, 1990, the United Nations Trusteeship Council terminated the TTPI as it applied to the CNMI and five other of the TTPI's original seven districts (the Marshall Islands and the Federated States of Micronesia (Chuuk, Kosrae, Pohnpei and Yap)), this was acknowledged in United Nations Security Council Resolution 683 passed on the same day.

Under the Covenant, only certain provisions of the U.S. Constitution apply to the Commonwealth and legislation passed by the U.S. Congress can only apply to the Commonwealth if it applies to all 50 states.  The CNMI is outside the customs area of the United States and bona fide residents of the Commonwealth are exempt from U.S. federal income tax, as is the case in the four self-governing territories. According to the Covenant, the federal minimum wage and federal immigration laws "will not apply to the Northern Mariana Islands except in the manner and to the extent made applicable to them by the Congress by law after termination of the Trusteeship Agreement." Local control of minimum wage was superseded by the United States Congress in 2007; it was slowly raised until in 2015 it reached parity with the 50 states.

Initially under the Covenant a separate immigration system existed in the CNMI, and U.S. immigration law did not apply; but the Covenant gave the United States power of reservation over immigration law in the Commonwealth. After reports surfaced of abusive practices for immigrant workers, on November 28, 2009, the United States exercised its power of reservation; specifically, CNRA § 702(a) amended the Covenant to state that "the provisions of the 'immigration laws' (as defined in section 101(a)(17) of the Immigration and Nationality Act (8 U.S.C. 1101(a)(17))) shall apply to the Commonwealth of the Northern Mariana Islands." Further, under CNRA § 702(a), the "immigration laws," as well as the amendments to the Covenant, "shall...supersede and replace all laws, provisions, or programs of the Commonwealth relating to the admission of aliens and the removal of aliens from the Commonwealth." Transition to U.S. immigration laws began November 28, 2009.

Judicial system
Cases under federal law are heard by the District Court for the Northern Mariana Islands, which was established by act of Congress in 1977, and began operations in January 1978. The court sits on the island of Saipan, but may sit other places within the commonwealth. The district court has the same jurisdiction as all other United States district courts, including diversity jurisdiction and bankruptcy jurisdiction. Appeals are taken to the Ninth Circuit. As a United States territorial court established under Congress's territorial power granted by Article IV of the United States Constitution, judges do not have lifetime appointments, unlike the Article III courts in the 50 states, District of Columbia, and Puerto Rico.

Cases under territorial law are heard by the Superior Court of the Commonwealth of the Northern Mariana Islands, with appeals heard by the Supreme Court of the Commonwealth of the Northern Mariana Islands.

Citizenship
Article III of the Covenant conferred United States citizenship on legally qualified CNMI residents, which generally included all citizens of the CNMI, and established U.S. birthright citizenship for persons born in the CNMI.

Economy

The Commonwealth of the Northern Mariana Islands benefits from its trading relationship with the federal government of the United States and cheap trained labor from Asia. Historically, the CNMI's economy has relied on tourism, mostly from Japan, and on the garment manufacturing sector. The economy has declined since quotas were lifted in 2005, eventually leading all the garment factories on Saipan to close by February 2009. Tourism also declined after 2005 when Japan Airlines stopped serving the Marianas.

Agricultural production, primarily of tapioca, cattle, coconuts, breadfruit, tomatoes and melons, exists, but is relatively unimportant in the economy, representing only 1.7% of its GDP as of 2016.

Non-native islanders are not allowed to own land, but can lease it.

Labor controversies
The Northern Mariana Islands had successfully used its position as a free trade area with the U.S., while at the same time not being subject to the same labor laws. For example, the $3.05 per hour minimum wage in the commonwealth, which lasted from 1997 to 2007, was lower than in the U.S. and some other worker protections are weaker, leading to lower production costs. That allowed garments to be labeled "Made in USA" without having to comply with all U.S. labor laws. However, the U.S. minimum wage law signed by President George W. Bush on May 25, 2007, resulted in stepped increases in the Northern Marianas' minimum wage, which allowed it to reach the U.S. level in 2015. The first step (to $3.55) became effective July 25, 2007, and a yearly increase of $0.50 will take effect every May thereafter until the CNMI minimum wage equals the nationwide minimum wage. However, a law signed by President Obama in December 2009 delayed the yearly increase from May to September. In 2018 the minimum wage finally reached $7.25, matching the U.S. federal minimum wage.

The island's exemption from U.S. labor laws had led to many alleged exploitations, including recent claims of sweatshops, child labor, child prostitution and forced abortions.

An immigration system mostly outside of federal U.S. control (which ended on November 28, 2009) resulted in a large number of Chinese migrant workers (about 15,000 during the peak years) employed in the islands' garment trade. However, the lifting of World Trade Organization restrictions on Chinese imports to the U.S. in 2005 had put the commonwealth-based trade under severe pressure, leading to a number of recent factory closures. Adding to the U.S.-imposed scheduled wage increases, the garment industry became extinct by 2009.

Infrastructure
The islands have over 220 miles (350 km) of highways, three airports with paved runways (one about 9,800 feet [3,000 m] long; two around 6,600 feet [2,000 m]), three airports with unpaved runways, and one heliport. The main commercial airport is Saipan International Airport.

Mail service for the islands is provided by the U.S. Postal Service (USPS). Each major island has its own ZIP code in the 96950–96952 range, and the USPS two-letter abbreviation for the CNMI is MP ("Marianas Pacific", NM and MI being taken). "CM" has been used previously and is still used in some contexts, but can be confused with Cameroon. For phone service, the islands are included in the North American Numbering Plan, using area code 670.

Television service is provided by KPPI-LD, Channel 7, which simulcasts Guam's ABC affiliate KTGM, as well as WSZE, Channel 10, which simulcasts Guam's NBC affiliate KUAM-TV. About 10 radio stations broadcast within the CNMI.

In 2012 Michael Calabrese, Daniel Calarco, and Colin Richardson of Slate stated that CNMI internet prices were five times those of Guam, and that the price per megabit increases if a customer chooses a higher level internet package due to the limited bandwidth.

Demographics

According to the 2020 census, the population of the CNMI was 47,329, down from 69,221 in 2000. The decrease was reportedly due to a combination of factors including the demise of the garment industry (the vast majority of whose employees were females from China), economic crises, and a decline in tourism, one of the CNMI's primary sources of revenue.

Except for the U.S. Minor Outlying Islands, the Northern Mariana Islands are the second least populous sub-federal jurisdiction in the United States, next to American Samoa.

Languages 
The official languages on the Northern Mariana Islands include English, Chamorro, and Carolinian. Few people still speak the nearly extinct Tanapag language. Many Philippine languages, Chinese, and other Pacific island languages are also spoken. Spanish is still retained in surnames but is no longer commonly used, though it is still familiar to some elders as a third or fourth language.

Ethnic groups
 Asian (including Filipino, Chinese, Korean, Japanese, Bangladeshi and other Asian) 49.9%
 Chamorro, Carolinian, Palauan and Other Pacific Islander 34.9%
 Multiracial 12.7%
 Others 2.5%

Religion

Owing to the Spanish missionaries in the Marianas, a large majority of Chamorros and Carolinians practice Roman Catholicism. The Japanese occupation had the effect of creating a sizable Buddhist community which remained even after their departure. Due to influence of the United States, diverse denominations of Protestantism also entered the islands.
Many people on the Northern Mariana Islands are Roman Catholic or have traditional beliefs.
According to the Pew Research Center, 2010:
 Roman Catholic 64.1%
 Protestants 16%
 Buddhists 10.6%
 Folk religions 5.3%
 Other Christians 1.2%
 Other religions 1.1%
 Unaffiliated 1.0%
 Eastern Orthodox <1%
 Hindu <1%
 Muslim <1%
 Jews <1%
The Church of Jesus Christ of Latter-day Saints reported 865 members in a ward (congregation) in the Northern Mariana Islands.

Education
The Commonwealth of the Northern Mariana Islands Public School System operates public schools in the commonwealth and there are numerous private schools. Northern Marianas College is accredited by the Western Association of Schools and Colleges and offers a range of programs similar to other small U.S. community colleges.

Culture

Much of the Chamorro culture in the Mariana Islands was heavily influenced by the Spanish during the Spanish era, as well as by the Germans and Japanese. Respect is an important part of Chamorro culture, and one common display is the tradition of "manngingi'". This tradition has been around for centuries and involves an elder and a young Chamorro child. The child takes the hand of the elder, places it on their nose and says ñot to the men and ñora to the women with the elders responding diosti ayudi (from Spanish Señor, Señora, Dios Te Ayude), meaning "God help you".

The Carolinian culture is very similar to the Chamorro culture with respect being very important. The Carolinian culture can be traced back to Yap and Chuuk, where the Carolinians originated.

Cuisine
Much of Chamorro cuisine is influenced by various cultures. Examples of popular foods of foreign origin include various types of sweet or savory empanada, originally introduced from Spain, and pancit, a noodle dish from the Philippines.

Archeological evidence reveals that rice has been cultivated in the Marianas since prehistoric times. Red rice made with achoti is a distinct staple food that strongly distinguishes Chamorro cuisine from that of other Pacific islands. It is commonly served for special events, such as parties (gupot or "fiestas"), novenas, and high school or college graduations. Fruits such as lemmai (breadfruit), mangga (mangoes), niyok (coconuts), and bilimbines (bilimbi, a fruit related to starfruit) are included in various local recipes. Korean, Chinese, Japanese, and American cuisine are also commonly available.

Local specialities include kelaguen, a dish in which meat is cooked in whole or in part by the action of citric acid rather than heat; tinaktak, a meat dish made with coconut milk; and kå'du fanihi (flying fox/fruit bat soup). Fruit bats have become scarce in modern times on several islands, primarily due to the overharvesting of the species and loss of habitat; hunting them is now illegal even though poaching still occurs.

The Marianas and the Hawaiian islands are the world's foremost consumers, per capita, of Spam, with Guam at the top of the list, and Hawaii second (details regarding the rest of the Marianas are often absent from statistics). Spam was introduced to the islands by the American military as war rations during the World War II era.

Cinema

A small independent cinema of Northern Mariana Islands, producing mostly documentary films, developed in the 21st century thanks to the efforts of the Commonwealth and of the Northern Marianas College. Films had already been shot in the islands in the 20th century by foreign producers.

In 2002, a new § 2151 of the Commonwealth Code established within the Marianas Visitors Authority (MVA), a Commonwealth Film, Video and Media Office, also known as the Northern Mariana Islands Film Office, with the purpose of attracting foreign companies to produce movies in the Commonwealth and to develop a local cinema industry.

Sports

Team sports popular in the United States were introduced to the Northern Mariana Islands by American soldiers during World War II. Baseball is the islands' most popular sport. CNMI teams have made appearances in the Little League World Series (in the Little, Junior, Senior and Big league divisions) as well as winning gold medals in the Micronesian Games and South Pacific Games.

Basketball and mixed martial arts are also popular in the islands, which hosted the official 2009 Oceania Basketball Tournament. Trench Wars is the CNMI's Mixed Martial Arts brand. Fighters from the CNMI have competed in the Pacific Xtreme Combat as well as the UFC.

Other sports in the CNMI include Ultimate Frisbee, volleyball, tennis, soccer, outrigger sailing, softball, beach volleyball, rugby, golf, boxing, kickboxing, tae kwon do, track and field, swimming, triathlon, and football.

See also

 An Act to amend Public Law 93-435 with respect to the Northern Mariana Islands
 Outline of the Northern Mariana Islands
 Index of Northern Mariana Islands-related articles

 List of National Register of Historic Places in the Northern Mariana Islands

Notes

References

Further reading
 The World Factbook, 2000.
 Land areas and population data from United States Census Bureau.
 Northern Mariana Islands and constituent municipalities, United States Census Bureau

External links

Government
 Commonwealth of the Northern Mariana Islands official website
 The CNMI Covenant
 The CNMI Constitution
 CNMI Office of Resident Representative Pedro A. Tenorio
 H.R. 873 – The Northern Mariana Islands Delegate Act
 H.R. 5550 – The United States-Commonwealth of the Northern Marianas Human Dignity Act

General
 U.S. Census Bureau: Island Areas Census 2000
 Northern Mariana Islands. The World Factbook. Central Intelligence Agency.

News media
 KSPN-TV Channel 2 News
 Saipan Tribune
 Marianas Variety
 The Pacific Times
 Food for Thought – Weekly commentary on CNMI society by KZMI and KCNM manager Harry Blalock

Other
 The Insular Empire: America in the Mariana Islands, PBS documentary film & website
 Northern Mariana Islands Online Encyclopedia
 USA Department of the Interior – Insular Area Summary for the Northern Mariana Islands

 
Archipelagoes of the Pacific Ocean
Archipelagoes of Oceania
Countries in Micronesia
Geography of Micronesia
Insular areas of the United States
Island countries
Islands of Oceania
Lists of coordinates
Small Island Developing States
States and territories established in 1898
1898 establishments in Oceania
1898 establishments in the German colonial empire
Former colonies in Oceania
Former German colonies
Former Japanese colonies
Former Spanish colonies
German New Guinea
South Seas Mandate
Spanish East Indies
Trust Territory of the Pacific Islands
World War II sites
English-speaking countries and territories